Hebden, Hebdon, and Hibdon are names all thought to be derived from one of several placenames in West Yorkshire, coming from the Old English "heope", or "(rose) hip", and "denu", which meant "valley".

Less common variations are Heberden, Hepden, Habdon, and Hibden.

Bearers of the name
John Hebden (1712–1765), British composer
Kieran Hebden, British musician performing as Four Tet
Malcolm Hebden (born 1940), British actor
Mark Hebden (born 1958), British chess grandmaster
Richard Hebden O'Grady Haly (1841–1911), commander of British forces in Canada
 William Heberden, one of the most eminent British physicians of the 18th century

Fictional characters 
Shula Hebden Lloyd (née Archer), and her first husband Mark Hebden, on the radio programme The Archers

See also 

 Ebden (disambiguation), includes people with the surname
 Ebdon, a surname

External links
 Houseofnames.com
 Manfamily.org
 Surnamedb.com

English toponymic surnames